Maurice August Verdonck (21 April 1879 – 1 March 1968) was a Belgian rower who competed in the 1900 Summer Olympics. He was part of the Belgian boat Royal Club Nautique de Gand, which won the silver medal in the men's eight.
He also participated at the art competitions in Literature, Lyric Works, Open at the 1928 Summer Olympics.

References

External links

Maurice Verdonck's profile at databaseOlympics

1879 births
1968 deaths
Belgian male rowers
Olympic rowers of Belgium
Rowers at the 1900 Summer Olympics
Olympic silver medalists for Belgium
Flemish sportspeople
Olympic medalists in rowing
Medalists at the 1900 Summer Olympics
European Rowing Championships medalists
20th-century Belgian people
Royal Club Nautique de Gand rowers
Olympic competitors in art competitions